Peggy Laurayne Baker (née Smith; born October 22, 1952) is a Canadian modern dancer, choreographer and teacher. She has been awarded the Order of Canada and she was the first person to receive the Ontario Premier’s Award for Excellence in the Arts.

Life
Baker was born in Edmonton, Alberta, Canada. She was the second child of six. She has lived in Canada and the United States.

Education and early work
Baker first studied acting at the University of Alberta. While there Baker was introduced to Modern Dance by Patricia Beatty, one of the founders of the Toronto Dance Theatre. In 1971 she moved to Toronto to study with Beatty at the School of Toronto Dance Theatre. After graduating from the school she appeared with the company as a dancer. In 1974 she co-founded the Dancemakers Dance Company. In 1980 she moved to New York City to dance with the Lar Lubovitch Dance Company. In 1990 she joined Mikhail Baryshnikov’s dance company White Oak Dance Project which re-launched her career as a dancer and choreographer. She performed her first solo concert in 1990 called Le Charme d l'Impossible. It was commissioned by the Canada Dance Festival and premiered at the Winnipeg Dance Festival.

In 1993 she was invited to be the National Ballet School of Canada's first artist-in-residence.

She founded the Peggy Baker Dance Projects to develop solo dance expression. In 1993 she was hired as the National Ballet of Canada's first artist-in-residence to teach, choreograph and stage Lar Lubovitch's work.

Personal life
Baker married her first husband Michael J. Baker in Edmonton before she moved to Toronto.

Baker met her future husband Ahmed Hassan in the 1970s when he composed for some of Baker’s work. They married in 1990 and remained married until his death in 2011 of multiple sclerosis.

Awards
In 2006 Baker was awarded the Order of Canada and in 2007 she was the first person to receive the Ontario Premier’s Award for Excellence in the Arts.

In 2010 the Canada Council for the Arts presented Baker with the Walter Carsen Prize.

References

1952 births
Canadian choreographers
Canadian female dancers
Living people
Members of the Order of Canada
Members of the Order of Ontario
Modern dancers
People from Edmonton
Canadian women choreographers